Malaysian may refer to:

 Something from or related to Malaysia, a country in Southeast Asia
 Malaysian Malay, a dialect of Malay language spoken mainly in Malaysia
 Malaysian people, people who are identified with the country of Malaysia regardless of their ethnicities. Most Malaysians are of Malay, Chinese and Indian descent.
 Malaysian diaspora, Malaysian emigrants and their descendants around the world
 Malaysian cuisine, the food and food culture of Malaysia
 Malaysian culture, culture associated with Malaysia
 The call sign and colloquial name of Malaysia Airlines

See also
 Malaysian names, names as used by the Malaysian people
 
 
 Malays (disambiguation)
 Malaya (disambiguation)
 Malay (disambiguation)

Language and nationality disambiguation pages